Burrard was a federal electoral district in British Columbia, Canada, that was represented in the House of Commons of Canada from 1896 to 1904 and from 1917 to 1925. This riding was created in 1892 from parts of New Westminster riding. In 1903, this riding was redistributed into Vancouver City, Comox—Atlin and Yale—Cariboo, and was re-created from Vancouver City and Comox—Atlin in 1914. It was abolished in 1924 into Vancouver North and Vancouver—Burrard.

Members of Parliament

Election results

Burrard, 1917–1921

Burrard, 1896–1904

See also 
 List of Canadian federal electoral districts
 Past Canadian electoral districts

External links 
 Website of the Parliament of Canada
 Riding history 1892 - 1903 from the Library of Parliament
Riding history 1914 - 1924 from the Library of Parliament

Former federal electoral districts of British Columbia